Mad River Township is one of the twelve townships of Champaign County, Ohio, United States. As of the 2010 census the population was 2,821.

Geography
Located in the southwestern part of the county, it borders the following townships:
Concord Township - north
Salem Township - northeast corner
Urbana Township - east
Moorefield Township, Clark County - southeast corner
German Township, Clark County - south
Pike Township, Clark County - southwest corner
Jackson Township - west
Johnson Township - northwest

No municipalities are located in Mad River Township, although the unincorporated communities of Thackery and Westville lie in the township's southwest and northeast respectively.

Name and history
Mad River Township was organized in 1805.

Named for the river that flows through it, it is one of three Mad River townships statewide. The other townships of this name are located in Clark and Montgomery counties.

Government
The township is governed by a three-member board of trustees, who are elected in November of odd-numbered years to a four-year term beginning on the following January 1. Two are elected in the year after the presidential election and one is elected in the year before it. There is also an elected township fiscal officer, who serves a four-year term beginning on April 1 of the year after the election, which is held in November of the year before the presidential election. Vacancies in the fiscal officership or on the board of trustees are filled by the remaining trustees.

References

External links
County website
County and township map of Ohio

Townships in Champaign County, Ohio
Townships in Ohio